Szilágy (Romanian: Sălaj) was an administrative county (comitatus) of the Kingdom of Hungary. Its territory is now in north-western Romania. The capital of the county was Zilah (present-day Zalău in Romania).

Geography

Szilágy county shared borders with the Hungarian counties of Bihar, Szatmár, Szolnok-Doboka and Kolozs. The rivers Someş and Crasna flowed through the county. Its territory was largely the same as that of the present Romanian county Sălaj. Its area was 3,815 km2 around 1910.

History
Szilágy county was formed in 1876, when the counties of Kraszna (its center was Kraszna/Crasna at first, then Valkóváralja/Sub Cetate, later Szilágysomlyó/Șimleu Silvaniei), Közép-Szolnok (its center was Zilah/Zalău) and the Egregy/Agrij district of Doboka County were united.

In 1920, by the Treaty of Trianon, the county became part of Romania. It was returned to Hungary by the Second Vienna Award in 1940, with a slightly modified territory. After World War II, it became again part of Romania. Most of it is now part of the Romanian county Sălaj, except for some areas in the north-west (now in Satu Mare county) and north-east (now in Maramureş county).

Demographics

Subdivisions

In the early 20th century, the subdivisions of Szilágy county were:

See also
 Szilágyi surname

Notes

References

States and territories established in 1940
States and territories disestablished in 1920
States and territories disestablished in 1945
Counties in the Kingdom of Hungary
Crișana